The Hereditary Prince(ss) of Monaco is the title given to the heir apparent or heir presumptive of the Monegasque throne, since its official creation on 15 May 1882. Traditionally, a male Hereditary Prince is also given the title Marquis of Baux. Like the Reigning Sovereign Prince and all other members of the Princely Family, the Hereditary Prince or Hereditary Princess is styled His or Her Serene Highness.

List of Hereditary Princes of Monaco

See also 
 Succession to the Monegasque throne

Monegasque titles
 
Monaco
Lists of Monegasque people